The 1963 World Table Tennis Championships women's doubles was the 26th edition of the women's doubles championship.
Kimiyo Matsuzaki and Masako Seki defeated Diane Rowe and Mary Shannon in the final by three sets to one.

Results

See also
List of World Table Tennis Championships medalists

References

-
1963 in women's table tennis